Old Malton is a village in North Yorkshire, England. The village is on the B1257 which links Malton with the A64 and the A169 road to the north and is bounded on its eastern side by the River Derwent.

History

Old Malton appears in the Domesday Book as Maltune (meaning Middleton), the present day settlement of Malton (or New Malton) came after Old Malton.

St Mary's Priory Church in the village was founded as a Gilbertine Priory in the 12th century. A church had previously existed in the village as recorded in the Domesday Book, but it is believed that this was damaged when Thurstan of Bayeaux (then Archbishop of York) burned the village to the ground in 1138 after the Battle of the Standard. Eustace Fitz-John, the local landowner, donated the damaged church to the Gilbertine order and they rebuilt the church as a priory. After the Dissolution, the church was reformed as the parish church of Old Malton which it remained as until 1896 when Old and New Malton were joined together as a civil parish. The church still exists today and is noted for being the only Gilbertine Priory church in use for regular worship in England. The building, though largely amended since the Dissolution and renovated by Temple Moore in the 19th century, is now grade I listed.

In May 1547, Archbishop Robert Holgate issued letters patent which declared that three grammar schools would be built in the region including one at Old Malton. The school was in existence until 1835, when the incumbent vicar at St Mary's church moved the pupils to his own school in nearby Norton. The grammar school buildings are still standing as two private dwellings and are now grade II listed.

Eden Camp Second World War Museum is in the village.

References

External links

Villages in North Yorkshire
Malton, North Yorkshire